Eliphalet Stone could mean

Eliphalet Stone (Massachusetts), state representative from Massachusetts
Eliphalet Stone (Wisconsin shipmaster), state representative from Wisconsin